This is a list of universities in Vietnam. It includes comprehensive universities, specialized universities, "senior colleges", institutes, conservatories, and military academies. The list is organized into public, private, and foreign-owned institutions.

Public universities

Universities (Đại học) 
 Vietnam National University, Hanoi (Đại học Quốc gia Hà Nội)
 University of Economics and Business (Trường Đại học Kinh tế)
 University of Education (Trường Đại Học Giáo Dục)
 University of Languages and International Studies (Trường Đại học Ngoại ngữ)
 Hanoi University of Science (Trường Đại học Khoa học Tự nhiên)
 University of Social Science and Humanity (Trường Đại học Khoa học Xã hội và Nhân văn)
 University of Engineering and Technology (Trường Đại học Công nghệ)
 School of Law (Khoa Luật)
 School of Medicine and Pharmacy (Khoa Y Dược)
 School of International Studies (Khoa Quốc tế)
 School of Interdisciplinary Studies (Khoa các Khoa học liên ngành)
 Vietnam National University, Ho Chi Minh City (Đại học Quốc gia Thành phố Hồ Chí Minh, formerly Viện Đại học Sài Gòn [1957-1975])
 VNUHCM - Ho Chi Minh University of Technology (Trường Đại học Bách khoa - Đại học Quốc gia Thành phố Hồ Chí Minh)
 VNUHCM - International University (Trường Đại học Quốc tế - Đại học Quốc gia Thành phố Hồ Chí Minh)
 VNUHCM - University of Economics and Law (Trường Đại Học Kinh Tế - Luật - Đại học Quốc gia Thành phố Hồ Chí Minh)
 VNUHCM - University of Science (Trường Đại học Khoa học Tự nhiên - Đại học Quốc gia Thành phố Hồ Chí Minh)
 VNUHCM - University of Social Sciences and Humanities (Trường Đại học Khoa học Xã hội và Nhân văn - Đại học Quốc gia Thành phố Hồ Chí Minh)
 VNUHCM - University of Information Technology (Trường Đại học Công Nghệ Thông Tin - Đại học Quốc gia Thành phố Hồ Chí Minh)
 VNUHCM - University of An Giang (Trường Đại học An Giang - Đại học Quốc gia Thành phố Hồ Chí Minh)
 Faculty of Medicine (Khoa Y - Đại học Quốc gia Thành phố Hồ Chí Minh)
 Institute for Resources and Environment (Trung tâm nghiên cứu tài nguyên và môi trường)
 Hanoi University of Science and Technology (formerly Hanoi University of Technology - Trường Đại học Bách Khoa Hà Nội)
 Ho Chi Minh City University of Technology and Education (Đại học Sư phạm Kỹ thuật Thành phố Hồ Chí Minh)
 Can Tho University (Đại học Cần Thơ; formerly Viện Đại học Cần Thơ [1966-1975])
Hanoi Foreign Trade University (Trường Đại học Ngoại Thương Hà Nội)
Hanoi Medical University (Trường Đại học Y Hà Nội)
Hanoi National University of Education (Trường Đại học Sư Phạm Hà Nội)
Hanoi University (Trường Đại học Hà Nội, formerly Hanoi University of Foreign Studies - Trường Đại học Ngoại Ngữ Hà Nội)
Hanoi University of Agriculture ([Đại học Nông nghiệp Hà Nội, formerly Đại học Nông nghiệp 1 Hà Nội]) 
 Hanoi University of Civil Engineering (Trường Đại học Xây Dựng)
 Hanoi University of Industry (Đại học Công Nghiệp Hà Nội, high-technology and engineering)
Hanoi University of Natural Resources and Environment (Đại học Tài nguyên và Môi trường Hà Nội)
 Hanoi University of Mining and Geology (Trường Đại học Mỏ - Địa chất)
Ho Chi Minh City Medicine and Pharmacy University  (Đại học Y Dược Thành phố Hồ Chí Minh)
 Ho Chi Minh City Open University (Đại học Mở Thành phố Hồ Chí Minh)
National Economics University (Trường Đại học Kinh tế Quốc dân)
Nông Lâm University (Agriculture and Forestry) (Đại học Nông lâm Thành phố Hồ Chí Minh)
University of Economics, Ho Chi Minh City (Trường Đại học Kinh tế Thành phố Hồ Chí Minh)
Banking University Ho Chi Minh City (Trường Đại học Ngân hàng Thành phố Hồ Chí Minh)
University of Transport and Communications (Trường Đại học Giao thông Vận tải)
 An Giang University (Đại học An Giang) (became a member of VNU-HCM from 2017)
Dalat University (Đại học Đà Lạt; formerly, Viện Đại học Đà Lạt)
Dong Nai University (Đại học Đồng Nai)
Electric Power University (Trường Đại học Điện lực)
Hai Phong Medical University (Đại học Y dược Hải Phòng)
Hai Phong University (Đại học Hải Phòng)
Hanoi Architectural University (Đại học Kiến trúc Hà Nội)
Ho Chi Minh City University of Architecture (Đại học Kiến trúc Thành phố Hồ Chí Minh)
Ho Chi Minh City University of Fine Arts (Đại học Mỹ thuật Thành phố Hồ Chí Minh)
Ho Chi Minh City University of Finance and Marketing(Đại học Tài chính Marketing Thành Phố Hồ Chí Minh)
Ho Chi Minh City University of Food Industry (Trường Đại Học Công Nghiệp Thực Phẩm)
Ho Chi Minh City University of Industry (Đại học Công nghiệp Thành phố Hồ Chí Minh)
Vinh University (Đại học Vinh)
Hue University (Đại học Huế; formerly Viện Đại học Huế [1957-1975])
Hue College of Agriculture and Forestry (Trường Đại học Nông lâm Huế)
Hue College of Arts (Trường Đại học Nghệ thuật Huế)
Hue College of Economics (Trường Đại học Kinh tế Huế)
Hue College of Foreign Languages
Hue University of Medicine and Pharmacy (Trường Đại học Y Dược, Đại học Huế)
Hue College of Teacher Training (Trường Đại học Sư phạm Huế)
Foreign Trade University, Ho Chi Minh City Campus (Trường Đại học Ngoại Thương cơ sở II - TP. HCM)
Hanoi Open University (Đại học Mở Hà Nội)
Hanoi University of Law (Trường Đại học Luật Hà Nội)
Hanoi Pedagogical University N°2 (Trường Đại học Sư Phạm Hà Nội 2)
Thai Nguyen University (Đại học Thái Nguyên), Thai Nguyen
Thai Nguyen University of Technology (Trường Đại học Kĩ thuật Công nghiệp Thái Nguyên)
Thai Nguyen University of Education (Trường Đại học Sư phạm Thái Nguyên)
University of Da Nang (Đại học Đà Nẵng)
Da Nang College of Education (Trường Đại học Sư phạm Đà Nẵng)
Da Nang College of Foreign Languages (Trường Đại học Ngoại ngữ Đà Nẵng)
Da Nang College of Information Technology (Trường Đại học Công nghệ Thông tin Đà Nẵng)
Da Nang College of Technology (Trường Cao đẳng công nghệ Đà Nẵng)
Da Nang University Branch at Kontum (Chi nhánh Trường Đại học Đà Nẵng tại Kontum)
Da Nang University of Economics (Trường Đại học Kinh tế Đà Nẵng)
Da Nang University of Technology (Trường Đại học Bách khoa Đà Nẵng)
University of Labour - Social Affairs (Trường Đại học Lao động - Xã hội)
 University of Labour and Social Affairs 2, Ho Chi Minh City (Đại học Lao Động - Xã Hội cơ sở phía Nam)
 Bac Giang University of Agriculture and Forestry (Đại học Nông - Lâm Bắc Giang) 
 Cần Thơ University of Technology (Đại Học Kỹ Thuật- Công Nghệ Cần Thơ)
 Dong Thap University (Đại học Đồng Tháp)
 Hong Duc University (Đại học Hồng Đức)
 Hung Vuong University (Đại học Hùng Vương - Phú Thọ)
 Nha Trang Fisheries University (Đại học Thuỷ sản Nha Trang)
 Nha Trang University (Đại học Nha Trang)
 Nguyen Tat Thanh University
 Pham Ngoc Thach University of Medicine (Đại học Y Khoa Phạm Ngọc Thạch)
 Quy Nhon University (Đại học Quy Nhơn)
 Tay Bac University (Đại học Tây Bắc)
 Tay Nguyen University (Đại học Tây Nguyên)
 Thai Binh University of Medicine (Đại học Y dược Thái Bình)
 Ton Duc Thang University (Đại học Tôn Đức Thắng, Thành phố Hồ Chí Minh)
 Tra Vinh University (Đại học Trà Vinh, Thành phố Trà Vinh)
 University of Communications and Transportation (Đại học Giao thông Vận tải)
 University of Finance and Accountancy (Đại học Tai chinh Ke Toan)
 Vietnam Forestry University (Đại học Lâm nghiệp)
 Vietnam Maritime University (Đại học Hàng hải)
 Vietnam University of Commerce (Đại học Thương mại)
 Vietnamese-German University (Đại học Việt-Đức)
 VinUniversity
 Water Resources University (Đại học Thủy lợi)
 Ha Noi university of culture ( Đại học văn hóa Hà Nội )
 University Of Transport Technology (Trường Đại học Công nghệ Giao thông Vận tải)
 PetroVietnam University (Trường Đại học Dầu khí Việt Nam)

Senior colleges (Trường Đại học) 

 Hanoi School of Public Health (Trường Đại học Y tế Công cộng)
 Hanoi University of Pharmacy (Trường Đại học Dược Hà Nội)
 Ho Chi Minh City University of Pedagogy (Trường Đại học Sư phạm Thành phố Hồ Chí Minh)
 Ho Chi Minh City University of Transportation (Trường Đại học Giao Thông Vận Tải Thành phố Hồ Chí Minh)
 Trade Union University (Trường Đại học Công Đoàn)

Academy (Học viện)
 Academy of Finance and Accounting (Học viện Tài chính Kế toán)
 Academy of Finance of Vietnam (Học viện Tài chính Việt Nam)
 Banking Academy of Vietnam (Học viện Ngân hàng Việt Nam)
 Diplomatic Academy of Vietnam (Học viện Ngoại giao Việt Nam)
 Ho Chi Minh National Academy of Politics and Public Administration (Học viện Chính trị - Hành chính Quốc gia Hồ Chí Minh)
 Academy of Journalism and Communication (Học viện Báo chí và Tuyên truyền Việt Nam)
 National Academy of Public Administration (Học viện Hành chính Việt Nam)
 Institut de la Francophonie pour l'Informatique
 Institute for International Relations (Học viện Quan hệ Quốc tế)
 National Institute of Education Management (Học viện Quản lý Giáo dục Việt Nam)
 Posts and Telecommunications Institute of Technology (Học viện Công nghệ Bưu chính Viễn thông)
 Vietnam Academy of Science and Technology (Viện Hàn lâm Khoa học và Công nghệ Việt Nam)
 Vietnam Academy of Social Sciences (Viện Khoa học Xã hội Việt Nam)
 Graduate Academy of Social Sciences (Học viện Khoa học Xã hội Việt Nam)
 Vietnam Aviation Academy (Học viện Hàng không Việt Nam)
 Vietnam University of Traditional Medicine
 Hanoi Academy of Theatre and Cinema (Học viện Sân Khấu Điện Ảnh Hà Nội)

Conservatories (Nhạc viện)
 Hanoi Conservatory of Music (Nhạc viện Hà Nội)
 Ho Chi Minh City Conservatory (Nhạc viện thành phố Hồ Chí Minh)
 Hue Conservatory (Nhạc viện Huế)

Military academies

 Cryptography Techniques Academy (Học viện Kỹ thuật Mật mã)
 Vietnam Border Defense Force Academy (Học viện Biên phòng)
 Military Technical Academy (Học viện Kỹ thuật Quân sự Việt Nam), also known as Le Quy Don Technical University (Đại học Kỹ thuật Lê Quý Đôn)
 National Defense Academy (Học viện Quốc phòng)
 Military Logistics Academy (Học viện Hậu cần)
 Military Science Academy (Học viện Khoa học Quân sự)
 Air Defense and Air Forces Academy (Học viện Phòng không - Không quân Việt Nam)
 Vietnam Military Academy, Dalat (Học viện Lục quân Đà Lạt)
 Vietnam Military Medical University (Học viện Quân y), also known as Le Huu Trac Medical University (Đại học Y dược Lê Hữu Trác)
 Military Political Academy (Học viện Chính trị Quân sự)
 1st Army Officer School or University of Army Officer No.1 (Trường Sỹ quan Lục quân 1), also known as Tran Quoc Tuan University (Đại học Trần Quốc Tuấn)
 2nd Army Officer School or University of Army Officer No.2 (Trường Sỹ quan Lục quân 2), also known as Nguyen Hue University (Đại học Nguyễn Huệ)
 Military Political Officer School (Trường Sỹ quan Chính trị), also known as Military Political University (Đại học Chính trị)
 Vietnam Naval Academy (Học viện Hải quân)
 Vietnam Air Force Officer School (Trường Sỹ quan Không quân)
 Artillery Officer School (Trường Sỹ quan Pháo binh)
 Military Information Officer School or Military College of Information (Trường Sỹ quan Thông tin), also known as Telecommunication University (Đại học Thông tin liên lạc)
 Military Engineer Officer School or Military College of Engineer (Trường Sỹ quan Công binh), also known as Ngo Quyen University (Đại học Ngô Quyền)
 Chemical Officer School or Military College of Chemical Forces (Trường Sỹ quan Phòng hoá)
 Special Forces Officer School or Military College of Special Forces (Trường Sỹ quan Đặc công)
 Tank and Armored Officer School or Military College of Tank and Armored (Trường Sỹ quan Tăng-Thiết giáp)
Military University of Culture and Arts
Viettel Academy (Học viện Viettel)

Private universities

Private universities (Đại học tư thục, formerly Đại học dân lập)
 Bac Ha International University (Đại học Quốc tế Bắc Hà)
 Binh Duong University (Đại học Bình Dương - BDU)
 Đông Á University (Đại học Đông Á)
 Duy Tan University (Đại học Duy Tân - DTU) 
 Eastern International University (Đại học quốc tế Miền Đông - EIU)
 FPT University (Đại học FPT)
 Fulbright University Vietnam (Đại học Fulbright Việt Nam)
 Gia Dinh University (Đại học Gia Định)
 Hai Phong Private University
 Hanoi University of Business and Technology (Đại học Kinh Doanh và Công Nghệ Hà Nội - HUBT)
 Hung Vuong University Ho Chi Minh City (Đại học Hùng Vương TPHCM - HVUH)
 Ho Chi Minh City University of Foreign Languages and Information Technology (Đại học Ngoại ngữ Tin học Thành phố Hồ Chí Minh)
 Ho Chi Minh City University of Technology - HUTECH (Đại học Dân lập Kỹ thuật Công nghệ Thành phố Hồ Chí Minh; HUTECH)
 Hoa Sen University (Đại học Hoa Sen - HSU)
 Hong Bang International University (Đại học Quốc tế Hồng Bàng - HIU)
 Long An University of Economics and Industry (Đại học Kinh Tế Công Nghiệp Long An - DLA or LAU)
 Nguyen Tat Thanh University (Đại học Nguyễn Tất Thành - NTU)
 Phu Xuan University (Trường Đại học Dân lập Phú Xuân, Huế)
 Phuong Dong University (Đại học Phương Đông)
 Quang Trung University (Đại học Quang Trung)
 Saigon International University (Đại học Quốc Tế Sài Gòn - SIU)
 Saigon Technology University (Đại học công nghệ Sài Gòn - STU)
 Vo Truong Toan University (Đại học Võ Trường Toản - VTTU)
 Tan Tao University (Đại học Tân Tạo - TTU)
 Thang Long University (Đại học Thăng Long)
 Ho Chi Minh City University of Economics and Finance (Đại học Kinh Tế - Tài Chính TPHCM - UEF)
 Pacific Vietnam University (Đại học Quốc Tế PACIFIC Vietnam)
 Van Hien University (Đại học Văn Hiến)
 Van Lang University  (Đại học Văn Lang)
 Van Xuan University of Technology (Đại học Công nghệ Vạn Xuân - VXUT)
 VinUniversity (Trường Đại học VinUni) 
 Western University Hanoi (Đại học Thành Tây, Hà Nội)

Senior colleges (Trường Đại học)
 Lac Hong University (Trường Đại học Lạc Hồng)
 Long An University of Economy and Industry (Trường Đại học Kinh tế Công nghiệp Long An - DLA or LAU)
 PACE Institute of Leadership and Management
 Thai Binh University (Trường Đại học Thái Bình)

Foreign universities 
 British University Vietnam (U.K.)
 Griggs University Vietnam (U.S.)
 PSB College Vietnam (Singapore)
 RMIT University Vietnam (Australia)
 Fulbright University Vietnam (U.S)
 Broward College Vietnam (U.S)
 Kaizen Institute in Vietnam (Global)

See also 
 Education in Vietnam
 Vietnam Ministry of Education and Training (universities)
 Vietnam Ministry of Industry (vocational schools)
 Vietnam Ministry of Transport (schools and colleges)

References

External links 
 https://universityimages.com/list-of-universities-in-vietnam/

 
Universities
Vietnam
Vietnam